This is a list of known mammals in the US state of Missouri.

Order: Artiodactyla
Family: Bovidae
Subfamily: Bovinae
Genus: Bison
American bison, B. bison reintroduced
Family: Cervidae
Subfamily: Capreolinae
Genus: Odocoileus
Mule deer, O. hemionus vagrant
White-tailed deer, O. virginianus
Subfamily:: Cervinae
Genus: Cervus
Elk, C. canadensis reintroduced
Eastern elk, C. c. canadensis 
Rocky Mountain elk, C. c. nelsoni introduced
Family: Suidae
Genus: Sus
Wild boar, Sus scrofa introduced

Order: Carnivora
Family: Canidae
Genus: Canis
Coyote, Canis latrans
Gray wolf, Canis lupus extirpated
Great Plains wolf, C. l. nubilus extinct
Red wolf, Canis rufus extirpated
Genus: Urocyon
Gray fox, Urocyon cinereoargenteus
Genus: Vulpes
Red fox, Vulpes vulpes
Family: Felidae
Genus: Lynx
Bobcat, Lynx rufus
Genus: Puma
Cougar, Puma concolor extirpated, vagrant
Eastern cougar, P. c. couguar 
Family: Mephitidae
Genus: Mephitis
Striped skunk, Mephitis mephitis
Genus: Spilogale
Eastern spotted skunk, Spilogale putorius
Family: Mustelidae
Subfamily: Lutrinae
Genus: Lontra
North American river otter, Lontra canadensis
Subfamily: Mustelinae
Genus: Mustela
Least weasel, Mustela nivalis
Genus: Neogale
Long-tailed weasel, Neogale frenata
American mink, Neogale vison
Genus: Taxidea
American badger, Taxidea taxus
Family: Procyonidae
Genus: Procyon
Raccoon, Procyon lotor
Family: Ursidae
Genus: Ursus
American black bear, Ursus americanus

Order: Chiroptera
Family: Molossidae
Genus: Nyctinomops
Big free-tailed bat, Nyctinomops macrotis
Genus: Tadarida
Mexican free-tailed bat, Tadarida brasiliensis
Family: Vespertilionidae
Subfamily: Vespertilioninae
Genus: Lasiurus
Eastern red bat, Lasiurus borealis
Hoary bat, Lasiurus cinereus
Genus: Corynorhinus
Rafinesque's big-eared bat, Corynorhinus rafinesquii
Townsend's big-eared bat, Corynorhinus townsendii
Genus: Eptesicus
Big brown bat, Eptesicus fuscus
Genus: Lasionycteris
Silver-haired bat, Lasionycteris noctivagans
Genus: Myotis
Southeastern myotis, Myotis austroriparius
Western small-footed bat, Myotis ciliolabrum
Gray bat, Myotis grisescens
Keen's myotis, Myotis keenii
Eastern small-footed myotis, Myotis leibii
Little brown bat, Myotis lucifugus
Northern long-eared myotis, Myotis septentrionalis
Indiana bat, Myotis sodalis
Genus: Nycticeius
Evening bat, Nycticeius humeralis
Genus: Perimyotis
Eastern pipistrelle, Pipistrellus subflavus

Order: Cingulata
Family: Dasypodidae
Subfamily: Dasypodinae
Genus: Dasypus
Nine-banded armadillo, Dasypus novemcinctus

Order: Didelphimorphia
Family: Didelphidae
Subfamily: Didelphinae
Genus: Didelphis
Virginia opossum, Didelphis virginiana

Order: Lagomorpha
Family: Leporidae
Genus: Lepus
Black-tailed jackrabbit, Lepus californicus
White-tailed jackrabbit, Lepus townsendii
Genus: Sylvilagus
Swamp rabbit, Sylvilagus aquaticus
Eastern cottontail, Sylvilagus floridanus

Order: Rodentia
Family: Castoridae
Genus: Castor
North American beaver, Castor canadensis
Family: Cricetidae
Subfamily: Arvicolinae
Genus: Ondatra
Muskrat, Ondatra zibethicus
Subfamily: Neotominae
Genus: Ochrotomys
Golden mouse, Ochrotomys nuttalli
Genus: Peromyscus
Texas mouse, Peromyscus attwateri
Brush mouse, Peromyscus boylii
Cotton mouse, Peromyscus gossypinus
White-footed mouse, Peromyscus leucopus
Eastern deer mouse, Peromyscus maniculatus
Western deer mouse, Peromyscus sonoriensis
Genus: Reithrodontomys
Fulvous harvest mouse, Reithrodontomys fulvescens
Western harvest mouse, Reithrodontomys megalotis
Plains harvest mouse, Reithrodontomys montanus
Genus: Microtus
Prairie vole, Microtus ochrogaster
Meadow vole, Microtus pennsylvanicus
Woodland vole, Microtus pinetorum
Genus: Neotoma
Florida woodrat, Neotoma floridana
Genus: Oryzomys
Marsh rice rat, Oryzomys palustris
Genus: Synaptomys
Southern bog lemming, Synaptomys cooperi
Genus: Sigmodon
Hispid cotton rat, Sigmodon hispidus
Family: Dipodidae
Subfamily: Zaponidae
Genus: Zapus
Meadow jumping mouse, Zapus hudsonius
Family: Geomydae
Genus: Geomys
Plains pocket gopher, Geomys bursarius
Family: Heteromyidae
Genus: Perognathus
Plains pocket mouse, Perognathus flavescens
Family: Muridae
Subfamily: Murinae
Genus: Mus
House mouse, Mus musculus introduced
Genus: Rattus
Brown rat, Rattus norvegicus introduced
Black rat, Rattus rattus introduced
Family: Myocastoridae
Genus: Myocastor
Nutria, Myocastor coypus introduced
Family: Sciuridae
Subfamily: Sciurinae
Genus: Sciurus
Fox squirrel, Sciurus niger
Eastern gray squirrel, Sciurus carolinensis
Subfamily: Xerinae
Genus: Poliocitellus
Franklin's ground squirrel, Poliocitellus franklinii
Genus: Glaucomys
Southern flying squirrel, Glaucomys volans
Genus: Ictidomys
Thirteen-lined ground squirrel, Ictidomys tridecemlineatus
Genus: Marmota
Groundhog, Marmota monax
Genus: Tamias
Eastern chipmunk, Tamias striatus

Order: Eulipotyphla
Family: Soricidae
Subfamily: Soricinae
Genus: Blarina
Northern short-tailed shrew, Blarina brevicauda
Southern short-tailed shrew, Blarina carolinensis
Elliot's short-tailed shrew, Blarina hylophaga
Genus: Cryptotis
North American least shrew, Cryptotis parva
Genus: Sorex
Southeastern shrew, Sorex longirostris
Cinereus shrew, Sorex cinereus
Family: Talpidae
Genus: Scalopus
Eastern mole, Scalopus aquaticus

References

Schwartz, Charles Walsh & Schwartz, Elizabeth Reeder (2001). Wild Mammals of Missouri, Second Revised Edition. University of Missouri Press. 

Mammals
Missouri